Dorval—Lachine—LaSalle is a federal electoral district on Montreal Island in Quebec. It encompasses a portion of Quebec formerly included in the electoral districts of LaSalle—Émard and Notre-Dame-de-Grâce—Lachine.

Dorval—Lachine—LaSalle was created by the 2012 federal electoral boundaries redistribution and was legally defined in the 2013 representation order. It came into effect upon the call of the 2015 Canadian federal election, which took place October 19, 2015.

The riding was originally intended to be named Dorval—Lachine.

Geography
The district includes the municipalities of Dorval and L'Île-Dorval, the borough of Lachine  and part of the borough of LaSalle in Montreal.

Members of Parliament

This riding has elected the following Members of Parliament:

Election results

References

Dorval
Lachine, Quebec
LaSalle, Quebec
Federal electoral districts of Montreal
2013 establishments in Quebec